A multiple independently targetable reentry vehicle (MIRV) is an exoatmospheric ballistic missile payload containing several warheads, each capable of being aimed to hit a different target. The concept is almost invariably associated with intercontinental ballistic missiles carrying thermonuclear warheads, even if not strictly being limited to them. By contrast, a unitary warhead is a single warhead on a single missile. An intermediate case is the multiple reentry vehicle (MRV) missile which carries several warheads which are dispersed but not individually aimed. Only the United States, the United Kingdom, France, Russia, China and India are currently confirmed to have deployed MIRV missile systems. Pakistan is developing MIRV missile systems. Israel is suspected to possess or be in the process of developing MIRVs.

The first true MIRV design was the Minuteman III, first successfully tested in 1968 and introduced into actual use in 1970. The Minuteman III held three smaller W62 warheads of about  each in place of the single  W56 used in the earlier versions of this missile. From 1970 to 1975, the United States would remove approximately 550 earlier versions of the Minuteman ICBM in the Strategic Air Command's (SAC) arsenal and replace them with the new Minuteman IIIs outfitted with a MIRV payload, increasing their overall effectiveness. The smaller power of the warhead was offset by increasing the accuracy of the system, allowing it to attack the same hard targets as the larger, less accurate, W56. The MMIII was introduced specifically to address the Soviet construction of an anti-ballistic missile (ABM) system around Moscow; MIRV allowed the US to overwhelm any conceivable ABM system without increasing the size of their own missile fleet. The Soviets responded by adding MIRV to their R-36 design, first with three warheads in 1975, and eventually up to ten in later versions. While the United States phased out the use of MIRVs in 2014 to comply with New START, Russia continues to develop new missile designs using the technology.

The introduction of MIRV led to a major change in the strategic balance. Previously, with one warhead per missile, it was conceivable that one could build a defence that used missiles to attack individual warheads. Any increase in missile fleet by the enemy could be countered by a similar increase in interceptors. With MIRV, a single new enemy missile meant that multiple interceptors would have to be built, meaning that it was much less expensive to increase the attack than the defence. This cost-exchange ratio was so heavily biased towards the attacker that the concept of mutual assured destruction became the leading concept in strategic planning and ABM systems were severely limited in the 1972 Anti-Ballistic Missile Treaty in order to avoid a massive arms race.

Purpose 
The military purpose of a MIRV is fourfold:
Enhance first-strike proficiency for strategic forces.
Providing greater target damage for a given thermonuclear weapon payload. Several small and lower yield warheads cause much more target damage area than a single warhead alone. This, in turn, reduces the number of missiles and launch facilities required for a given destruction level - much the same as the purpose of a cluster munition.
With single-warhead missiles, one missile must be launched for each target. By contrast, with a MIRV warhead, the post-boost (or bus) stage can dispense the warheads against multiple targets across a broad area.
Reduces the effectiveness of an anti-ballistic missile system that relies on intercepting individual warheads. While a MIRV attacking missile can have multiple warheads (312 on United States and Russian missiles, or 14 in a maximum payload shorter-range configuration of the Trident II now barred by START), interceptors may have only one warhead per missile. Thus, in both a military and an economic sense, MIRVs render ABM systems less effective, as the costs of maintaining a workable defence against MIRVs would greatly increase, requiring multiple defensive missiles for each offensive one. Decoy re-entry vehicles can be used alongside actual warheads to minimize the chances of the actual warheads being intercepted before they reach their targets. A system that destroys the missile earlier in its trajectory (before MIRV separation) is not affected by this but is more difficult, and thus more expensive to implement.

MIRV land-based ICBMs were considered destabilizing because they tended to put a premium on striking first. The world's first MIRV—US Minuteman III missile of 1970—threatened to rapidly increase the US's deployable nuclear arsenal and thus the possibility that it would have enough bombs to destroy virtually all of the Soviet Union's nuclear weapons and negate any significant retaliation. Later on the US feared the Soviet's MIRVs because Soviet missiles had a greater throw-weight and could thus put more warheads on each missile than the US could. For example, the US MIRVs might have increased their warhead per missile count by a factor of 6 while the Soviets increased theirs by a factor of 10. Furthermore, the US had a much smaller proportion of its nuclear arsenal in ICBMs than the Soviets. Bombers could not be outfitted with MIRVs so their capacity would not be multiplied. Thus the US did not seem to have as much potential for MIRV usage as the Soviets. However, the US had a larger number of submarine-launched ballistic missiles, which could be outfitted with MIRVs, and helped offset the ICBM disadvantage. It is because of their first-strike capability that land-based MIRVs were banned under the START II agreement. START II was ratified by the Russian Duma on 14 April 2000, but Russia withdrew from the treaty in 2002 after the US withdrew from the ABM treaty.

Mode of operation 
In a MIRV, the main rocket motor (or booster) pushes a "bus" (see illustration) into a free-flight suborbital ballistic flight path. After the boost phase, the bus manoeuvres using small on-board rocket motors and a computerised inertial guidance system. It takes up a ballistic trajectory that will deliver a re-entry vehicle containing a warhead to a target and then releases a warhead on that trajectory. It then manoeuvres to a different trajectory, releasing another warhead, and repeats the process for all warheads.

The precise technical details are closely guarded military secrets, to hinder any development of enemy counter-measures. The bus's on-board propellant limits the distances between targets of individual warheads to perhaps a few hundred kilometres. Some warheads may use small hypersonic airfoils during the descent to gain additional cross-range distance. Additionally, some buses (e.g. the British Chevaline system) can release decoys to confuse interception devices and radars, such as aluminized balloons or electronic noisemakers.

Accuracy is crucial because doubling the accuracy decreases the needed warhead energy by a factor of four for radiation damage and by a factor of eight for blast damage. Navigation system accuracy and the available geophysical information limits the warhead target accuracy. Some writers believe  that government-supported geophysical mapping initiatives and ocean satellite altitude systems such as Seasat may have a covert purpose to map mass concentrations and determine local gravity anomalies, in order to improve accuracies of ballistic missiles. Accuracy is expressed as circular error probable (CEP). This is the radius of the circle that the warhead has a 50 percent chance of falling into when aimed at the center. CEP is about 90–100 m for the Trident II and Peacekeeper missiles.

MRV
A multiple re-entry vehicle (MRV) system for a ballistic missile deploys multiple warheads above a single aimpoint which then drift apart, producing a cluster bomb-like effect. These warheads are not individually targetable. The advantage of an MRV over a single warhead is the increased effectiveness due to the greater coverage; this increases the overall damage produced within the centre of the pattern, making it far greater than the damage possible from any single warhead in the MRV cluster; this makes for an efficient area-attack weapon and makes interception by anti-ballistic missiles more challenging due to the number of warheads being deployed at once.

Improved warhead designs allow smaller warheads for a given yield, while better electronics and guidance systems allow greater accuracy. As a result, MIRV technology has proven more attractive than MRV for advanced nations. Multiple-warhead missiles require both a miniaturised physics package and a lower mass re-entry vehicle, both of which are highly advanced technologies. As a result, single-warhead missiles are more attractive for nations with less advanced or less productive nuclear technology. The United States first deployed MRV warheads on the Polaris A-3 SLBM in 1964 on the USS Daniel Webster. This system was also used by the Royal Navy who also retained MRV with the Chevaline upgrade, though the number of warheads in Chevaline was reduced to two due to the ABM counter-measures carried. The Soviet Union deployed 3 MRVs on the R-27U SLBM and 3 MRVs on the R-36P ICBM. Refer to atmospheric re-entry for more details.

MIRV-capable missiles

China
DF-3A (retired, 3 warheads)
DF-4A (retired, 3 warheads)
DF-5B (active, 3-8 warheads)
DF-5C (active, 10 warheads)
DF-31A (active, 3-5 warheads)
DF-31B (active, 3-5 warheads)
DF-41 (active, up  to 10 warheads)
JL-2 (active, 1-3 warheads)
JL-3 (under development)

France
M4 (retired, 6 warheads)
M45 (active, 6 warheads)
M51 (active, 6-10 warheads)

India	
Agni-P (Successfully test-fired in October 2022) 
Agni-V (MIRV capability planned, existing ability suspected)
Agni-VI (Under development)
K-5 (Under trials, MIRV demonstration pending)
K-6 (missile)(Under development)

Iran
Khorramshahr missile (under development, announced optional capability) 

Israel
Jericho 3 (active, suspected capability, not announced, 2-3 technically possible)

Pakistan
Ababeel (Under trials, MIRV demonstration pending)

USSR/Russian Federation

R-36 mod 4 (retired, 10-14 warheads)
R-36 mod 5 (active, 10 warheads)
R-29R (active, 3 warheads)
R-29RK (retired, 7 warheads)
MR-UR-100 Sotka (retired, 4 warheads)
UR-100N mod 3 (retired, 6 warheads)
RSD-10 Pioneer (retired, 3 warheads)
R-39 Rif (retired, 10 warheads)
R-29RM Shtil (retired, 4 warheads)
RT-23 Molodets (retired, 10 warheads)
R-29RMU Sineva (active, 4 or 10 warheads)
RS-24 Yars (active, 3-4 warheads)
R-29RMU2 Layner (active, 4 or 12 warheads)
RSM-56 Bulava (active 6-10 warheads)
RS-28 Sarmat (under development, 10-15 warheads)
RS-26 Rubezh (development stopped, 4 warheads)
BZhRK Barguzin (development stopped, 4-16 warheads)

United States and United Kingdom
UGM-133 Trident II (active, 8-14 warheads)

United States
LGM-30 Minuteman III (active, 1-3 warheads, currently carries one warhead)
UGM-73 Poseidon (retired, 10 or 14 warheads)
UGM-96 Trident I (retired, 8 warheads)
LGM-118 Peacekeeper (retired, 10 warheads)
UGM-133 Trident II (active 8-14 warheads)

See also
 Comparison of ICBMs
 DARPA Falcon Project
 List of ICBMs
 Maneuverable re-entry vehicle (MARV or MaRV)
 Missile Command—1980s video game in which MIRVs must be intercepted
 Multiple Kill Vehicle

References
Notes

External links

"MIRV: A BRIEF HISTORY OF MINUTEMAN and MULTIPLE REENTRY VEHICLES" by Daniel Buchonnet, Lawrence Livermore Laboratory, February 1976.
Operation 1964
The Defense of the United States, 1981 CBS Five-Part TV Series from Google Video

Ballistic missiles

Penetration aids